Atlas is an unincorporated community in Napa County, California. It lies at an elevation of 1719 feet (524 m).

Atlas, named for nearby Atlas Peak, was founded as a resort community.  The Atlas post office opened in 1893, moved in 1894, and closed in 1934.

References

Unincorporated communities in Napa County, California
Vaca Mountains
Unincorporated communities in California